Hampstead & Westminster Hockey Club is a field hockey club based in London, England. It was established in 1894. The home ground is at Paddington Recreation Ground, Maida Vale.

The Men's First Team play in the  Men's England Hockey League and the Women's First Team play in the Women's England Hockey League. The rest of the men's teams play in the Higgins Group London Hockey League. The women's teams play in the South Hockey League and the Middlesex Women's League.  The club is considered to be one of the largest adult hockey clubs in the UK and fields 12 Men's teams and 7 Ladies' sides, as well as various other mixed, junior and veterans sides.

Honours

Major National Honours
 2009–10 Men's National Cup Runner Up
 2011–12 Men's National Cup Runner Up
 2012–13 Men's National Cup Runner Up
 2013–14 Women's National Cup Runner Up
 2018–19 Men's League champions
 2018-19 Women's National Cup Runner Up

Age Group Honours
 2018 Men’s National Over 30s Cup Winner (Zak Hond)
 2018 Men’s National Over 40s Cup Winner
 2020–21 England Hockey Men’s Over 40s Championships Runner-Up

Players

Men's First Team Squad 2021–22 season

Ladies First Team Squad 2021–22 season

HWHC in Recent Seasons
In 2013/14 the Ladies finished runners up in the Investec Women's Cup, losing to Investec Premier Division side, Surbiton Hockey Club.

The 2014/15 season saw the ladies gain promotion from South Clubs' Women's Hockey League Division 1 into the prestigious England Hockey National League under Steve Menzies.  A club first and significant milestone for the Ladies.

September 2015, the Ladies 1st XI made their debut in the Investec Conference East Division.  Coached by, Mo Rahman, supported by Assistant Coach Richard Smith, Manager Jo Edmonson and Captain Annebeth Wijtenburg the girls finished 4th in their first season.

In 2016-17, the Men's 1st XI finished fourth in the England Hockey League, qualifying for the League Finals weekend for the first time in their history, ultimately finishing in 4th place overall.

In 2017-18, the Men's 1st XI finished fourth in the Men's England Hockey League once again, reaching the League Finals weekend and narrowly losing the final to Surbiton Hockey Club on penalties. The Ladies' 1st XI won the Women's England Hockey League East Conference and narrowly missed out on promotion to the Premier Division.

In July 2018 it was announced that Kate Richardson-Walsh and Sarah Kelleher would take over from Mike Delaney as the Ladies' 1st XI coaches for the 2018–19 Women's England Hockey League season

On Sunday 14 April 2019, the Men's 1st XI won the Men's England Hockey League for the first time in their 125 year history, beating Surbiton Hockey Club 3-1 in the National Final. On the same day, the Ladies' 1st XI were also promoted to the Women's England Hockey League Premier Division for the first time in their history after wins against Loughborough Students and Stourport Hockey Club.

Notable players

Men's internationals

 Chris Cargo
 Stuart Loughrey
 Michael Watt

 Andy Hayward
 Mitesh Patel
 Simon Towns

 Scott Webster 

 Stephane Vehrle-Smith

 David Jameson

 Kwandwane Browne

 Andrew Cornick
 Rhodri Furlong
 Jonny Gooch
 Steve Kelly
 Rupert Shipperley

 Matthew Guise-Brown
 Stephen Cant

Women's internationals

References

 
English field hockey clubs
Field hockey in London
Field hockey clubs established in 1894
1894 establishments in England